Prasophyllum incorrectum, commonly known as the golfer's leek orchid, is a species of orchid endemic to Tasmania. It has a single tubular, dark green leaf and up to twenty scented, yellowish-green and reddish-brown flowers. The largest population occurs on a golf course.

Description
The edges of the upturned part of the labellum are slightly wavy and there is a raised, fleshy green callus in its centre. Flowering occurs in October and November.

Taxonomy and naming
Prasophyllum incorrectum was first formally described in 2003 by David Jones from a specimen collected on the Campbell Town golf course and the description was published in Muelleria. The specific epithet (incorrectum) refers to the species having been previously described as included in Prasophyllum correctum.

Distribution and habitat
The golfer's leek orchid grows in moist grassland and in grassy places in woodland. It is only known from three populations in Campbell Town, the largest of which occurs on the local golf course.

Conservation
Prasophyllum incorrectum is listed as "Critically Endangered" under the Commonwealth Government Environment Protection and Biodiversity Conservation Act 1999 (EPBC) Act and as "Endangered" under the Tasmanian Threatened Species Protection Act 1995. The main threats to the population are land clearing and the conversion of native grassland to exotic species.

References

External links 
 

incorrectum
Flora of Tasmania
Endemic orchids of Australia
Plants described in 2003